Lovestone can refer to:

Sir Simon Lovestone (born 1961), British neurologist
Jay Lovestone (1897–1990), active in socialist and communist organizations in the United States
Lovestoneites, a group led by the above
Lovestone (band), a Finnish rock band active since 1999
A regional English name for Ivy

See also
"LoveStoned", a 2007 song by Justin Timberlake
Lovestoned (band), a German-Swedish pop band